Juan Chalas (born 7 July 1956) is a Dominican judoka. He competed in the men's lightweight event at the 1972 Summer Olympics.

References

1956 births
Living people
Dominican Republic male judoka
Olympic judoka of the Dominican Republic
Judoka at the 1972 Summer Olympics
Place of birth missing (living people)